John Davie (1800 – 1891) was a Scottish draper and activist for vegetarianism, temperance and several other causes.

Biography 
John Davie was born in Stirling, in 1800. He later attained wealth as a draper and was a United Presbyterian elder. Davie became a vegetarian at the age of 46 and for some time was secretary of the Vegetarian Society. He was opposed to alcohol, tobacco, vaccination and vivisection; he was a supporter of Chartism, peace, women's suffrage, and hydrotherapy. In 1830, he and other members of the Dunfermline Temperance Society formed the first Total Abstinence Society in Scotland. He was later managing director and one of the originators of the Waverly Hydrotherapy Institution at Melrose.

In 1874, Davie, W. Gibson Ward, Isaac Pitman, and Francis William Newman were described as "four leading vegetarians" in England.

The Vegetarian Society presented an address to Davie in March 1890, to celebrate him reaching his 90th year. In September of the same year, Davie attended the 2nd International Vegetarian Congress in London.

Davie died in March 1891, at the age of 91; his wife died soon afterwards.

References

Further reading 

 

1800 births
1891 deaths
19th-century Scottish businesspeople
Anti-vivisectionists
British anti-vaccination activists
Drapers
Organization founders
People associated with the Vegetarian Society
People from Dunfermline
People from Stirling
Scottish anti-war activists
Scottish drapers
Scottish merchants
Scottish Presbyterians
Scottish suffragists
Scottish temperance activists
Scottish vegetarianism activists